St. Mary's Cathedral Basilica is a Gothic Revival Catholic cathedral located in the downtown core of Halifax, Nova Scotia, Canada. It is the cathedral church of the Archdiocese of Halifax and is the largest Catholic church in the Archdiocese. Consecrated on October 19, 1899, it was made a basilica in 1950 by Pope Pius XII. The St. Mary's Cathedral Basilica boasts the tallest granite spire in North America.

History
The church has been significantly expanded and altered over time. Originally constructed of wood, it was replaced by a stone structure beginning in 1820 inspired (as were many churches of the day) by Saint Martin in the Fields in London. It was expanded to its present size beginning in 1869, according to designs of Patrick Keely who introduced the Gothic Revival facade and spire. Besides the Gothic features, the spire also includes Norman and Germanic design elements.

The facade and spire are notable for being built entirely of granite. All of the stone was locally obtained, except for the three portals which have a jamb shaft of pink Aberdeen granite.

The basilica was designated a National Historic Site of Canada in 1997.

The church was heavily damaged in the Halifax Explosion on 6 December 1917.  All of the stained glass windows were shattered by the force of the blast, and tiny pieces of glass were embedded in the walls.  In addition to being peppered by the glass shards, the paintings on the walls suffered water damage from a blizzard which entered the church through the broken windows.  The murals were covered over with white paint in the 1950s.  In June 2019, work was begun to remove the layers of white paint (using scalpels) and restore damaged portions of the paintings—a project expected to continue until January 2020.

Cemetery
St. Peter's Cemetery located to the west of St. Mary's Basilica is the oldest Catholic cemetery in Halifax, created when the original chapel was built at the site of the basilica in 1784. The St. Peter's Cemetery served as the main Catholic burial place in Halifax until 1843 when it was replaced by Holy Cross Cemetery.

See also 
List of oldest buildings and structures in Halifax, Nova Scotia
 List of oldest buildings in Canada

References

External links

 

Churches completed in 1899
19th-century Roman Catholic church buildings in Canada
Churches in Halifax, Nova Scotia
Roman Catholic cathedrals in Canada
Roman Catholic churches in Nova Scotia
Gothic Revival architecture in Halifax, Nova Scotia
Gothic Revival church buildings in Canada
Basilica churches in Canada